The March 1878 New Hampshire gubernatorial election was held on March 12, 1878. Republican nominee Benjamin F. Prescott defeated Democratic nominee Frank A. McKean with 50.60% of the vote.

General election

Candidates
Major party candidates
Benjamin F. Prescott, Republican
Frank A. McKean, Democratic

Other candidates
Samuel Flint, Greenback
Asa S. Kendall, Prohibition

Results

References

1878
New Hampshire
Gubernatorial